Tiéolé-Oula is a village in the far west of Ivory Coast. It is in the sub-prefecture of Taï, Taï Department, Cavally Region, Montagnes District. The Cavally River—which is the border with Liberia—is four kilometres west of the village.

Tiéolé-Oula was a commune until March 2012, when it became one of 1126 communes nationwide that were abolished.

Notes

Former communes of Ivory Coast
Populated places in Montagnes District
Populated places in Cavally Region